Claudio Besio (born 13 October 1970) is a retired Swiss football midfielder.

References

1970 births
Living people
Swiss men's footballers
FC St. Gallen players
FC Wil players
Association football midfielders
Swiss Super League players